Jean-Baptiste Bernaz (born 18 July 1987 in Fréjus) is a French sailor. He competed at the 2008 Summer Olympics, 2012 Summer Olympics, 2016 Summer Olympics and the 2020 Summer Olympics in the men's Laser class.

References

External links
 
 
 
 

1987 births
Living people
French male sailors (sport)
Sportspeople from Fréjus
Competitors at the 2013 Mediterranean Games
Competitors at the 2022 Mediterranean Games
Mediterranean Games gold medalists for France
Mediterranean Games silver medalists for France
Mediterranean Games medalists in sailing
Olympic sailors of France
Sailors at the 2008 Summer Olympics – Laser
Sailors at the 2012 Summer Olympics – Laser
Sailors at the 2016 Summer Olympics – Laser
Sailors at the 2020 Summer Olympics – Laser
20th-century French people
21st-century French people